Fin Smith (born 11 May 2002) is an English professional rugby union player who plays as a fly-half for Northampton Saints in the Premiership.

Smith qualifies for Scotland through his Grandfather Tom Elliot, a former British and Irish Lion and Scotland cap. 

Smith’s nickname amongst Worcester players is “Smithers”.

Club career
Smith started playing rugby at local club Shipston-on-Stour and Warwick School prior to joining the Worcester Warriors academy. At 18 years and 292 days, Smith became only the second 18-year-old to play for Warriors in the top flight when he made his debut as a replacement against Gloucester Rugby at Kingsholm on 27 February 2021.

Smith started for the Warriors side that beat London Irish in the final of the 2022 Premiership Rugby Cup to win Worcester their first ever top-flight trophy.

On 5 October 2022, all Worcester Warriors players' contracts were terminated due to liquidation of the company to which they were contracted. Smith joined Northampton Saints with immediate effect shortly after.

International career
Smith was selected for the England under-20 team to compete in the 2021 Six Nations Under 20s Championship and contributed significantly, starting in four out of five games and scoring a try against Scotland. England won the tournament and achieved a grand slam. In July 2022 Smith represented the England U20 team during a summer series of games in Italy.

Smith is the grandson of former Scotland and Lions prop Tom Elliot making him also eligible to represent Scotland.

In January 2023 he was called up by Steve Borthwick to the senior England squad for the 2023 Six Nations Championship.

References

External links

Worcester Profile
Ultimate Rugby Profile

2002 births
Living people
Ampthill RUFC players
English rugby union players
Rugby union players from Warwick
Worcester Warriors players
Rugby union fly-halves
People educated at Warwick School
English people of Scottish descent